Krzysztof Węglarz (born 21 February 1985) is a Polish judoka.

He won the bronze medal in the 81 kg class at the 2004 World Junior Championships and finished fifth in the middleweight (90 kg) class at the 2006 European Judo Championships.

He also competed at the 2010 and 2011 World Championships.

External links
 
 

1985 births
Living people
Polish male judoka
Place of birth missing (living people)